The common sole, Dover sole, or black sole (Solea solea) is a species of flatfish in the family Soleidae. It is one of the largest fish in the Solea genus. It lives on the sandy or muddy seabed of the northern Atlantic and the Mediterranean Sea where it often semi-immerses itself in the substrate. The upper side is greyish-brown while the underside is white. The species is prized as a food fish, being caught mostly by trawling on the seabed.

Description 
The small eyes are close to each other on the right side of the body. This gives the fish the possibility of lurking half-buried in the sand for passing prey. The common sole, just like all other flatfishes, hatches as an "ordinary" fish with one eye on each side of the body. The young metamorphose to flatfish when they are about one centimeter long. The upper side is greyish-brown and the underside is white. In the UK, a small sole is commercially called a "slip".

Biology 

 Females grow faster and larger than males, up to 30 inches long, about 2 to 4 inches longer than males.
 58 years, about 5 years longer than females.
 Dover sole spawn near the ocean floor in waters deeper than 1,440 feet. Spawning seasons vary by location:
 In the Gulf of Alaska from January to August.
 Off Oregon from November to April.
 In Puget Sound from January to March.
 Females produce between 52,000 to 266,000 eggs, which can be as large as 0.1 inches.
 Dover sole eggs are fertilized externally and are found in the upper part of the water column.
 Once hatched, larvae settle into deeper water, then travel inshore to find suitable nursery areas.
 Dover sole larvae usually settle to the bottom after a year of living in the upper water column, but some remain larvae for as long as 2 years.
 Scientists believe these “holdover” larvae delay settling to the bottom due to unfavorable environmental conditions.
 Dover sole feed during the daytime by sight and smell.
 Their mouths are well adapted for feeding on small invertebrates that live within ocean floor sediments.
 Larval Dover sole feed on small crustaceans, eggs, and larval crustaceans as well as plankton.
 Juveniles and adults feed on worms, bivalves, brittle stars, and small bottom-dwelling crustaceans.
 Seabirds and fish that live near the surface prey on larval Dover sole.
 Sharks, bottom-feeding marine mammals, Pacific cod, arrowtooth flounder, and sometimes sablefish feed on juveniles and adults.

Distribution and habitat 

It has a preference for relatively shallow water (10–60 m) with sand or mud covering the bottom. They can be found at depths up to 200 m. Their preferred temperature range is from 8–24 °C.

It is found in the Eastern Atlantic Ocean, from the south of Norway to Senegal, and in almost all of the Mediterranean Sea. In the winter, it withdraws to the somewhat warmer waters of the southern North Sea.

Diet
The Dover sole feeds at night. Its diet consists of worms, molluscs and crustaceans.

Population Status 
Dover sole is managed as part of the Bering Sea/Aleutian Islands Other Flatfish Complex and the stock complex has been assessed, but there is not enough information to determine the population size so the overfished status is unknown (2020 stock assessment).  This complex is not subject to overfishing based on 2021 catch data.

Lifecycle
The Dover sole reaches maturity at 3–5 years old, at which point they can begin to reproduce. Spawning usually occurs between February and May but in warmer areas it can also occur at the beginning of winter. It usually happens in shallow coastal waters that are between 6–12 °C.

After the eggs have been fertilised, the incubation period lasts around five days. The larvae become juvenile fish after around 35 days.

The maximum recorded age is 26 years old.

Ecology
An ectoparasite of the common sole is the leech Hemibdella soleae. The larvae settle on the upper surface of the fish, the only part not buried in the sediment, and after further development migrate to the underside, where they attach themselves with their suckers, feeding on the fish's blood.

Cuisine 

Chefs prize Dover sole for its mild, buttery, sweet flavour and versatility, and for its ease of filleting. The fish yields fillets that hold together well in a variety of recipes.

The name "Dover" comes from Dover, the English fishing port landing the most sole in the 19th century.

In 2010, Greenpeace International added the common sole to its seafood red list. "The Greenpeace International seafood red list is a list of fish that are commonly sold in supermarkets around the world, and which have a very high risk of being sourced from unsustainable fisheries."

Other species named "Dover sole" 
Because of its prestige, the name "Dover sole" was borrowed to name the eastern Pacific species Microstomus pacificus, a quite distinct species with different culinary properties: the Pacific sole has thinner, less firm fillets and sells for a lower price.

See also
Sole meunière

References

External links 
 
 

Soleidae
Commercial fish
Fish of the Atlantic Ocean
Fish of the Mediterranean Sea
Fish of the North Sea
Fish described in 1758
Taxa named by Carl Linnaeus